Baunt is a rural locality (a settlement) in Bauntovsky District, Republic of Buryatia, Russia. The population was 33 as of 2010. There are 4 streets.

Geography 
Baunt is located 106 km north of Bagdarin (the district's administrative centre) by road.

References 

Rural localities in Bauntovsky District